Alan Gabriel Sombra (born 23 May 1994) is an Argentine professional footballer who plays as a forward for Sacachispas.

Career
Sombra played in the youth set-up of Huracán up until 2016, with the forward terminating his contract in order to join Primera B Metropolitana side Deportivo Español. He made his professional bow on 13 September 2016 versus Estudiantes, though didn't appear again until the end of season play-offs as he featured in fixtures with Atlanta and Deportivo Riestra. All three of his appearances in 2016–17 were as a substitute, with his first start arriving in September 2017 against San Telmo. Sombra scored a total of five goals across his first three seasons, including three in 2018–19 as they were relegated to the fourth tier.

July 2019 saw Sombra join JJ Urquiza. He appeared seven times, just once as a starter, before departing in February 2020 to fellow tier three outfit Sacachispas. His debut came versus San Telmo on 9 March.

Career statistics

References

External links

1994 births
Living people
People from La Matanza Partido
Argentine footballers
Association football forwards
Primera B Metropolitana players
Deportivo Español footballers
Asociación Social y Deportiva Justo José de Urquiza players
Sacachispas Fútbol Club players
Sportspeople from Buenos Aires Province